Kallahti is a neighborhood in the Vuosaari district of Helsinki, Finland. The area consists mainly of apartment buildings built between 1991 and 1999. There are 6,854 inhabitants in Kallahti (1 January 2017).

Demographics
There are a total of 2,642 immigrants in Kallahti, making up nearly 40% of the population. 1,121 come from Europe (16.4%), 798 come from Asia (11.7%), 669 come from Africa (9.8%) and 54 come from elsewhere (0.8%). The share of people with a foreign background in Kallahti is the largest of all areas of Helsinki.

Politics
Results of the 2011 Finnish parliamentary election in Kallahti:

True Finns   22.5%
Social Democratic Party   21.7%
National Coalition Party   18.9%
Green League   12.7%
Left Alliance   11.5%
Centre Party   4.1%
Swedish People's Party   2.9%
Christian Democrats   2.9%

References

Vuosaari